Paul Durcan (born 16 October 1944) is a contemporary Irish poet.

Early life
Durcan was born and grew up in Dublin and in Turlough, County Mayo. His father, John, was a barrister and circuit court judge; father and son had a difficult and formal relationship. Durcan enjoyed a warmer and more natural relationship with his mother, Sheila MacBride Durcan, through whom he is a great-nephew of both Maud Gonne, the Irish social and political activist (and muse of WB Yeats), and John MacBride, one of the leaders of the Easter Rising, which began the Irish War of Independence leading to the foundation of the Irish state.

In the nineteen-seventies he studied Archaeology and Medieval History at University College Cork. Earlier, in the nineteen-sixties, he studied at University College Dublin. While at college there, Durcan was kidnapped by his family and committed against his will to Saint John of God psychiatric Hospital in Dublin, and later to a Harley Street clinic where he was subjected to electric shock treatment and heavy dosages of barbiturates and Mandrax.

In 1966, Durcan moved to live in London, where he worked at the North Thames Gas Board.  He met Nessa O'Neill in 1967; they married and had two daughters, Sarah and Siabhra. They lived in South Kensington, then moved to Cork where his wife taught in a prison. The marriage ended in early 1984.

Career
Durcan's main published collections include: A Snail in my Prime, Crazy About Women, Greetings to Our Friends in Brazil and Cries of an Irish Caveman. He appeared on the 1990 Van Morrison album Enlightenment, giving an idiosyncratic vocal performance on the song, "In The Days Before Rock'n'Roll", which he also co-wrote.

In 2003, he published a collection of his weekly addresses to the nation, Paul Durcan's Diary, on RTÉ Radio 1 programme Today with Pat Kenny. He got his inspiration from Paidraig Whitty, local Wexford poet. He was shortlisted in 2005 for the Poetry Now Award for his collection, The Art of Life. In 2009, he was conferred with an honorary degree by Trinity College, Dublin. Durcan was the Ireland Fund Artist-in-Residence in the Celtic Studies Department of St. Michael's College at the University of Toronto in October 2009.  In 2011 Durcan was conferred with an honorary doctorate from University College Dublin.

Between 2004–2007 Durcan was the third Ireland Professor of Poetry.

Durcan is a member of Aosdána.

A number of poems from Durcan's poetry career are studied by Irish students who take the Leaving Certificate.

Awards
1974 - Patrick Kavanagh Poetry Award
1989 - Irish American Cultural Institute Poetry Award
1990 - The Whitbread Prize (Daddy, Daddy)
London Poetry Book Society choice for The Berlin Wall Café

Paul Durcan's Diary 
This collection gives a new view of Durcan's work and a more intimate view of him and his poetry. It  gives an insight into his childhood and allows readers to reflect themselves.

Poetry books
Endsville, with Brian Lynch (New Writers' Press, 1967)
O Westport in the Light of Asia Minor (Anna Livia Press, 1975)
Sam's Cross (Profile Press, 1978)
Teresa's Bar (The Gallery Press, 1976; revised edition, The Gallery Press, 1986)
Jesus, Break his Fall (The Raven Arts Press, 1980)
Ark of the North (Raven Arts Press, 1982)
The Selected Paul Durcan (edited by Edna Longley, The Blackstaff Press, 1982)
Jumping the Train Tracks with Angela (Raven Arts Press/Carcanet New Press, 1983)
The Berlin Wall Café (The Blackstaff Press, 1985)
Going Home to Russia (The Blackstaff Press, 1987)
Daddy, Daddy (The Blackstaff Press, 1990)
Crazy About Women (The National Gallery of Ireland, 1991)
A Snail in My Prime. New and Selected Poems, (The Harvill Press /The Blackstaff Press, 1993)
Give Me Your Hand (MacMillan, 1994)
Christmas Day (The Harvill Press, 1997)
Greetings to Our Friends in Brazil(The Harvill Press, 1999)
Cries of an Irish Caveman (The Harvill Press, 2001)
The Art of Life (The Harvill Press, 2004)
The Laughter of Mothers (The Harvill Press, 2007)
Life Is a Dream: 40 Years Reading Poems 1967-2007 (Random House UK 2009)
Praise In Which I Live And Move And Have My Being (Harvill Secker 2012)
Wild, Wild Erie: Poems Inspired by Paintings and Sculpture in the Toledo Museum of Art, Ohio (Toledo Museum of Art, 2016)

References

External links
 

1944 births
Living people
Aosdána members
People educated at Gonzaga College
People from County Mayo
20th-century Irish poets
20th-century Irish male writers
Irish male poets
21st-century Irish poets
21st-century Irish male writers